Sandra L. Calvert is a developmental and child psychologist, whose scholarship illuminates the children's media area, including policy implications. Calvert is currently professor of psychology, and an affiliated faculty member at the McCourt School of Public Policy at Georgetown University. Calvert is also the co-founder and Director of the Children's Digital Media Center, a multi-university research initiative funded primarily by multiple grants from the National Science Foundation, as well as by private foundations. Calvert served as chair of the department of psychology at Georgetown University from 2006 to 2009.

Education and early career
Calvert received her B.A. degree with a major in psychology and a minor in sociology from West Virginia University, an MA degree in human development and family studies from the Pennsylvania State University, and her Ph.D. in developmental and child psychology from the University of Kansas. Her mentor for her doctoral degree was Aletha C. Huston, Ph.D. Prior to coming to Georgetown University, she served on the faculty in child development and family relations at the University of North Carolina-Greensboro.

Research
Calvert's research spans the fields of child psychology, communications, child development, health, medicine, and social policy.  She and her colleagues have been awarded more than $9.25 million in external funding to conduct research on children's media, including multiple collaborative grants from the National Science Foundation, the first of which was used to create the Children's Digital Media Center (CDMC). She has also received funding from private foundations, such as the Stuart Family Foundation, the Smith Richardson Foundation, and the Robert Wood Johnson Foundation.
 
Overall, Calvert has published seven books, more than 80 peer-reviewed journal articles, and more than 30 book chapters. She has also given more than 250 invited papers and refereed presentations at professional conferences and meetings. Calvert's research addresses seminal questions such as how learning from observational media interfaces like television and film are similar or different from more interactive media such as computers and tablets.  Her research has covered numerous content areas and media interfaces with children ranging in age from infancy through emerging adulthood. These topics include children's comprehension of media content, particularly of educational and prosocial content, and their parasocial interaction with media characters; the influence of gender roles in the media; the impact of video games on childhood aggression; the impact of marketing, including the role of media characters, and exergaming (video games that require movement) on childhood obesity; the role of media characters in mathematical skill learning; very early learning from media; and the role of production features (e.g., action, sound effects, dialogue) as representational tools to help children think about and understand content.  As media platforms have evolved and changed, she has grown with the times, examining diverse kinds of interfaces ranging from stories presented in television and film to computer, video, and virtual reality games, to apps on tablets and math games taught by intelligent agents.

Policy
Calvert has served on numerous advisory committees and made numerous media presentations to improve the quality of children's media, including a series of lectures for the U.S. State Department about creating quality educational media, which was hosted by the U.S. embassy in Macedonia. In the educational media area, she presented testimony before the Senate Committee on Commerce, Science, and Transportation about the impact and future of the Children's Television Act, which requires broadcasters to provide educational and informational programming for children. She also served on two committees for the National Academies, one on youth, pornography, and the Internet, and the second on the role of food marketing in the pediatric obesity crisis, as well as on an American Psychological Task Force to examine the impact of violent video games on youth aggression.

Awards and honors
American Psychological Association Fellow
International Communication Association Fellow
Erskine Fellow, University of Canterbury New Zealand
National Research Council (United States) Associate Award
Outstanding Young Women of America
Phi Beta Kappa 
Psi Chi Honorary

Recent representative publications

References

External links
Professor Calvert's Faculty Page at Georgetown
Children's Digital Media Center website
Sandra Calvert's CV
The Joan Ganz Cooney Center
Blog on Learning and Development
Hearing on Children's Television Act of 1990

Developmental psychologists
Living people
American women psychologists
21st-century American psychologists
People from South Charleston, West Virginia
McCourt School of Public Policy faculty
20th-century American scientists
21st-century American scientists
Pennsylvania State University College of Health and Human Development alumni
University of Kansas alumni
Fellows of the American Psychological Association
Year of birth missing (living people)
20th-century American women
American women academics
21st-century American women